Flix Interactive is a British video game developer based in Bromsgrove, Worcestershire. Founded by John Tearle, Lee Snookes and Matt Clark in late 2011, Flix Interactive are primarily known for co-development on Unreal Engine games like Sea of Thieves, Sniper Elite 5, Zombie Army 4: Dead War, Crackdown 3 and Hell Let Loose, They also independently developed Eden Star and launched the game on Steam Early Access in January 2015.

Games

References 

Video game development companies
Video game companies of the United Kingdom